This is a list of feature-length films released by Walt Disney Studios Home Entertainment for home entertainment. Some of the films were produced directly to home theater by Disney without a theatrical run, while some of them received a theatrical run in Europe. Others were originally produced by another company and released for a theatrical run, but later distributed on home video by Disney. They are not part of the Disney Animated Canon.

Produced and distributed by Disney

Animated films 1994–2015
The following is a list of films that were released straight to home-video and thus did not have a theatrical release. They were either produced by Walt Disney Pictures, Disney Television Animation, Pixar and/or Disneytoon Studios and the majority are sequels. Most of the sequels are notorious for their negative reception.

Live-action films 1997–2013

Other
 The Walt Disney Comedy and Magic Revue (1985)
 Walt Disney Video A-Longs (1986)
 Disney's Greatest Lullabies (1986)
 Disney Sing-Along Songs series (1986–2006)

Notes:

Distribution only

Walt Disney Home Video/Home Entertainment
 The Brave Little Toaster Goes to Mars (1998) (Produced by Hyperion Pictures)
 The Brave Little Toaster to the Rescue (1999) (Produced by Hyperion Pictures)
 Madeline: Lost in Paris (1999) (Produced by DIC Entertainment)
 Air Bud: World Pup (2000, produced by Keystone Pictures)
 The Book of Pooh: Stories from the Heart (2001) (Produced by Shadow Projects)
 The Other Side of Heaven (2001)
 Air Bud: Seventh Inning Fetch (2002, produced by Keystone Pictures)
 Where the Red Fern Grows (2003)
 Air Bud: Spikes Back (2003, produced by Keystone Pictures)
 The Girl Can Rock (2004)
 The Proud Family Movie (2005) (co-production with Hyperion Pictures & Jambalaya Studio)
 Little Einsteins: Our Huge Adventure (2005, produced by Curious Pictures and The Baby Einstein Company)
 Stanley's Dinosaur Round-Up (2006, co-production with Cartoon Pizza Productions)
 Air Buddies (2006, produced by Keystone Pictures)
 High School Musical: The Concert (2007)
 A Muppets Christmas: Letters to Santa (2008)
 Taare Zameen Par (Like Stars on Earth) (2010, produced by Aamir Khan Productions)

Buena Vista Home Video/Home Entertainment
 Street Sharks: The Gene Slamming Begins (1994, co-produced with Bohbot Entertainment)
 The Duke (1999, produced by Keystone Pictures)

DIC Toon-Time Video
 Double Dragon: The Shield of the Shadow Khan (1994)
 Mummies Alive! The Legend Begins (1998)
 Inspector Gadget: Gadget's Greatest Gadgets (2000)

Miramax Home Entertainment
 How the Toys Saved Christmas (1997)
 Bionicle: Mask of Light (2003, co-production with The Lego Group, Create TV & Film and Creative Capers Entertainment)
 Bionicle 2: Legends of Metru Nui (2004, co-production with The Lego Group, Create TV & Film and Creative Capers Entertainment)
 Bionicle 3: Web of Shadows (2005, co-production with The Lego Group, Create TV & Film and Creative Capers Entertainment)

Touchstone Home Video/Home Entertainment
 The Wonderful Ice Cream Suit (1998)

Notes:

See also
 List of Disney theatrical animated feature films
 List of Walt Disney Pictures films
 List of Disney+ original films
 List of Disney live-action adaptations and remakes of Disney animated films

Notes

External links
 Walt Disney Home Entertainment

 
Disney direct-to-video
Home entertainment